Academic professor Anastas Todorov Ishirkov (5 April 1868 – 6 April 1937)   was Bulgarian scientist, geographer and ethnographer. He was the founder of geographical science in Bulgaria and was a member of Bulgarian Academy of Sciences.

Honours
Ishirkov Crag on Oscar II Coast in Graham Land, Antarctica is named after Anastas Ishirkov.

Notes 

1868 births
1937 deaths
Bulgarian scientists
People from Lovech
Members of the Bulgarian Academy of Sciences
Members of the Macedonian Scientific Institute
Academic staff of Sofia University
Bulgarian geographers
Bulgarian ethnographers
Rectors of Sofia University
Burials at Central Sofia Cemetery